The Reichsgau Carinthia (German: Reichsgau Kärnten) was an administrative division of Nazi Germany in Carinthia and East Tyrol (both in Austria) and Upper Carniola in Slovenia. It existed from 1938 to 1945.

It was responsible for the administration of the de facto annexed Operational Zone of the Adriatic Littoral (Operationszone Adriatisches Küstenland, OZAK).

History
The Nazi Gau (plural Gaue) system was originally established in a party conference on 22 May 1926, in order to improve administration of the party structure. From 1933 onwards, after the Nazi seizure of power, the Gaue increasingly replaced the German states as administrative subdivisions in Germany. On 12 March 1938 Nazi Germany annexed Austria and on 24 May the Austrian provinces were reorganized and replaced by seven Nazi party Gaue. Under the Ostmarkgesetz law of 14 April 1939 with effect of 1 May, the Austrian Gaue were raised to the status of Reichsgaue and their Gauleiters were subsequently also named Reichsstatthalters.

At the head of each Gau stood a Gauleiter, a position which became increasingly more powerful, especially after the outbreak of the Second World War. Local Gauleiters were in charge of propaganda and surveillance and, from September 1944 onwards, the Volkssturm and the defence of the Gau.

The position of Gauleiter in Carinthia initially was held by Hubert Klausner from 1938 to 1939. Franz Kutschera was acting Gauleiter from 1939 to 1941, followed by Friedrich Rainer from 1941 to 1945.

References

External links
 Illustrated list of Gauleiter

Carinthia
Slovenia in World War II
History of Carinthia (region)
1938 establishments in Germany
1945 disestablishments in Germany